In enzymology, a dolichyl-phosphate D-xylosyltransferase is an enzyme that catalyzes the chemical reaction

UDP-D-xylose + dolichyl phosphate  UDP + dolichyl D-xylosyl phosphate

Thus, the two substrates of this enzyme are UDP-D-xylose and dolichyl phosphate, whereas its two products are UDP and dolichyl D-xylosyl phosphate.

This enzyme belongs to the family of glycosyltransferases, specifically the pentosyltransferases.  The systematic name of this enzyme class is UDP-D-xylose:dolichyl-phosphate D-xylosyltransferase.

References

 

EC 2.4.2
Enzymes of unknown structure